Ladies' Love Oracle is the first solo album by Grant-Lee Phillips. The song "Don't Look Down" was later covered by Robyn Hitchcock on his 2014 album The Man Upstairs.

Track listing
All tracks composed by Grant-Lee Phillips
"You're a Pony"—2:05
"Heavenly"—2:24
"Squint"—3:36
"Don't Look Down"—4:40
"Flamin' Shoe"—3:53
"Folding"—3:32
"Lonesome Serenade"—3:24
"Nothin' Is For Sure"—4:30
"St. Expedite"—3:00
"Snowflakes"—5:40 (found only on 2002 re-release of the album)

References

Grant-Lee Phillips albums
1999 debut albums